The 1990 European Indoor Championships was an ATP men's tennis tournament held in Berlin, Germany from 8 October until 14 October 1990. It was the inaugural edition of the tournament and was part of the World Series tier of the 1990 ATP Tour. Sixth-seeded Ronald Agénor won his third career title and his second of the year by defeating Alexander Volkov in the final.

Finals

Singles

 Ronald Agénor defeated  Alexander Volkov, 4–6, 6-4, 7–6(10–8)

Doubles
 Pieter Aldrich /  Danie Visser defeated  Kevin Curren /  Patrick Galbraith, 7–6, 7–6

References

External links
 ITF tournament edition details

European Indoor Championships
October 1990 sports events in Europe